The 1987 South Asian Games, officially the 3rd South Asian Federation Games were a multi-sport event, held in Kolkata, India from 20 November to 27 November 1987. It was the largest sporting event ever to be held in Kolkata, and West Bengal as a whole. This was also the first time when India hosted these Games.

The games were opened by Indian president R. Venkataraman and the Games Flame was carried by Indian runner Milkha Singh, with Leslie Claudius lighting the flame.

A total of 10 disciplines were contested in these Games. India was the major medal winner at these events, garnering approximately 43% of all the medals. Seven nations participated in these Games.

Sports 

Medal sports (10)
  Athletics
  Basketball (debut)
  Boxing
  Football
  Kabaddi 
  Swimming
  Table tennis (debut)
  Volleyball (debut)
  Weightlifting
  Wrestling

 Demonstration sport (1)
  Kho kho

Medal tally

References

 
South Asian Games
S
South Asian Games, 1987
1987 in Asian sport
Multi-sport events in India
International sports competitions hosted by India
Sports competitions in Kolkata